Timothy C. Ely  (born February 9, 1949) is a contemporary American painter, graphic artist, and bookbinder, known for creating single-copy handmade books as art objects.

Ely was born in Snohomish, Washington in 1949.  Following graduate school (University of Washington, MFA 1975), Ely undertook a self-directed study of bookbinding and began to create his first work..

Much of Ely’s work is annotated with his own glyphs he calls “cribriform.”  

With a National Endowment for the Arts Fellowship (1982) Ely traveled to Japan, Italy, and England to study bookbinding and paper making. He then moved to New York where he established a studio and taught at the Center for Book Arts. From New York, he moved his studio to Portland, Oregon, back to his native Pacific Northwest. His work is in many private and public collections, including the Library of Congress, the Brooklyn Museum, the Boston Athenaeum, the Getty Research Institute, the Victoria and Albert Museum, and the Lilly Library.

Ely has also collaborated with the writers David Abel (Memo 7 and Other Works, 1989) and Terence McKenna (Synesthesia, 1992), who also wrote the introduction to the 1995 trade publication of Ely's 1985 book Flight Into Egypt. Ely has also illustrated a small number of conventional or commercial projects.

Some of Ely's works includes: Heliotropy (1983, Smith College), Countercode Archeo-logic (1984, Harry Ransom Center, University of Texas), Triad (1985, Temple University), Optical Aleutians 4 (1986, National Art Library, Victoria & Albert Museum), Elementals (1989, Yale University), Totem (1989, Library of Congress), Sense 9 (1990, Florida Atlantic University), Doppler Gossip (1991, Brooklyn Museum), Alpha Deep (1991, Princeton University), Saturnia (1994, Lilly Library), Arka (1995, University of Utah), Pelidnota (1995, Stanford University), Gamma Cruxis (1997, Columbia University), Tables of Mercury (2000, Multnomah County Library), Time Stunt: Spore (2001 Boston Athenaeum),  Compound 12 (2005, University of Denver), Halo Chalice (2005, Lilly Library), Trajections (2006, Reed College), Formation (2008, University of Idaho), Index (2009, Lilly Library), Interference (2012, Bradley University), Polarity (2013, Lilly Library).

Ely currently lives in Colfax, Washington.

References

 Ely, Timothy C. Flight Into Egypt. San Francisco, Chronicle Books, 1995.
 Hale, Julie and Beth Sweet (eds.). Masters: Book Arts: Major Works by Leading Artists. New York, Lark Crafts, 2011.
The Bonefolder: an e-journal for the bookbinder and book artist. Vol. 1, No. 1, 2004.
 Hubert, Renée Riese, and Judd D. Hubert. The Cutting Edge of Reading: Artists' Books. New York, Granary Books, 1999.
 Lewis, Roy Harley. Fine Bookbinding in the Twentieth Century. Riverside, NJ, Simon & Schuster, 1984.

External links

 Timothy C. Ely Blog

Book artists
American contemporary artists
Living people
Western Washington University alumni
1949 births